"Un jour, un enfant" ("A Day, a Child") is one of four winning songs in the Eurovision Song Contest 1969, this one being sung in French by Frida Boccara representing .

The song was performed fourteenth on the night, following 's Siw Malmkvist with "Primaballerina" and preceding 's Simone de Oliveira with "Desfolhada portuguesa". At the close of voting, it had received 18 points, placing equal first in a field of 16.

The song is a classical ballad, describing the wonders of the world as seen by a child. Boccara recorded the song in five languages, French, English (as "Through the Eyes of a Child"), German ("Es schlägt ein Herz für dich", translated: "A Heart Beats for You"), Spanish ("Un día, un niño", translated: "A Day, a Child") and Italian ("Canzone di un amore perduto", translated: "Song of a Lost Love").

It was succeeded as French representative that year by Guy Bonnet with "Marie-Blanche".

Cover versions
 ABBA's Agnetha Fältskog covered the song in Swedish on her 1970 solo album "Som jag är", under the title "Sov gott, min lilla vän" (translated: "Sleep Well, My Little Friend").
 An instrumental version of the song by Paul Mauriat was used as a theme for the Philippine television drama anthology Lovingly Yours, Helen in 1981.

References

External links
 Official Eurovision Song Contest site, history by year, 1969
 Detailed info & lyrics, The Diggiloo Thrush, "Un jour, un enfant".
 Vivien Leigh
 Viv & Larry

Eurovision songs of France
Eurovision songs of 1969
French-language songs
Songs written by Eddy Marnay
Eurovision Song Contest winning songs
Philips Records singles
1969 songs